John Diamond (born 1966) is an American bridge player. Diamond won a world championship in 2010 and has won 6 North American Bridge Championships, and is often partnered with his longtime friend and fellow bridge player Brian Platnick.

Diamond is from Daytona Beach, Florida. He graduated from Duke University and University of Maryland.

Bridge accomplishments

Wins

 Rosenblum Cup (1) 2010 
 North American Bridge Championships (6)
 Fast Open Pairs (1) 2011 
 Silodor Open Pairs (1) 2014 
 Blue Ribbon Pairs (1) 2012 
 Jacoby Open Swiss Teams (1) 2010 
 Roth Open Swiss Teams (1) 2012 
 Spingold (2) 2010, 2017

Runners-up

 North American Bridge Championships (4)
 Fast Open Pairs (1) 2008 
 Nail Life Master Open Pairs (1) 2008 
 Vanderbilt (2) 2009, 2012

Notes

External links
 

1966 births
Living people
American contract bridge players
Date of birth missing (living people)
Place of birth missing (living people)
People from College Park, Maryland
University of Maryland, College Park alumni
Duke University alumni